Theater Kiel is a theatre company in Kiel, the capital of Schleswig-Holstein, Germany. It is jointly funded by the city and the state.

History 

The theatre dates its history to 1907, when the opera house was completed.

Associated people as of 2014 are general director , director of music Georg Fritzsch, commercial director Jörn Sturm, director of opera Reinhard Linden, director of children's and youth theater Norbert Aust, directors of ballet Yaroslav Ivanenko and Heather Jurgensen.

Buildings

Opernhaus Kiel

The Kiel Opera House is the city's major venue for opera, ballet, and orchestral performances. It was designed by architect Heinrich Seeling and built from 1905 to 1907. Aerial bombings destroyed much of the original structure in 1942 and 1943, and architects Henry Hansen and Guido Widmann were later brought in to restore the theatre from 1952 to 1953.

Schauspielhaus

Theater im Werftpark

Performances 

The first performance of Theater Kiel was Beethoven's Fidelio on 1 October 1907.
 
In 1988, the theatre was part of the co-commission of the opera The Making of the Representative for Planet 8 by Philip Glass, together with the  English National Opera, Houston Grand Opera, and Het Muziektheater, Amsterdam.

In the season 2007/2008, Theater Kiel celebrated its 100th anniversary. In addition to the program during the season, a summer event was held. The second opera by Cristóbal Halffter, Lázaro, was premiered on 4 May 2008 at the Kiel Opera House as part of the celebration.

In 2010, the first large scale stage work Márton Illés, was co-produced with the Munich Biennale. It premiered at the Gasteig, and was repeated in Kiel in May and June.

An open-air performance of Puccini's Tosca was presented at the Kiel Town Hall Square in 2012.

References

External links 
 Theater Kiel Official Website
Oper Kiel Official Website

Theatres in Germany
Buildings and structures in Kiel
Theatres completed in 1907